The Leprechaun is the ninth solo album by Chick Corea, released in 1976. It features horn and string sections, and vocals from Corea’s wife Gayle Moran, formerly of Mahavishnu Orchestra.

The album was recorded during Corea's time with his jazz fusion group Return to Forever.  Though the album is more jazz oriented than anything Return to Forever had produced up to that time, the fusion edge still rings through quite clearly. Corea was awarded the Grammy Award for Best Jazz Performance by a Group for the album and the Grammy Award for the Best Instrumental Arrangement for "Leprechaun's Dream, Pt. 1" at the 19th Annual Grammy Awards in 1977.

Track listing 
All pieces composed by Chick Corea unless otherwise noted.

Side one
"Imp's Welcome" – 2:56
"Lenore" – 3:26
"Reverie" – 2:01
"Looking at the World" (Lyrics: Neville Potter) – 5:29
"Nite Sprite" – 4:33

Side two
"Soft and Gentle" (Gayle Moran) – 5:09
"Pixiland Rag" – 1:11
"Leprechaun's Dream Part 1" – 6:29
"Leprechaun's Dream Part 2" – 6:34

Personnel 
 Chick Corea – acoustic piano, Fender Rhodes electric piano, Yamaha electric organ, Hohner clavinet, synthesizers (ARP Odyssey, Micromoog, Moog Model 15 modular synthesizer), percussion
 Danny Cahn, John Gatchell, Bob Millikan – trumpet
 Wayne Andre, Bill Watrous – trombone
 Joe Farrell – saxophone, flute
 Ani Kavafian, Ida Kavafian – violin
 Louise Shulman – viola
 Fred Sherry – cello
 Eddie Gómez – double bass
 Anthony Jackson – bass guitar
 Steve Gadd – drums
 Gayle Moran – vocals

Chart performance

References

External links 
 Chick Corea - The Leprechaun (1976) album review by Scott Yanow, credits & releases at AllMusic
 Chick Corea - The Leprechaun (1976) album releases & credits at Discogs

1976 albums
Chick Corea albums
Polydor Records albums
Grammy Award for Best Jazz Instrumental Album